Stepneyville is a suburb of Nelson, New Zealand.

Geography

The corresponding Statistics New Zealand statistical area is Britannia, which also includes Beachville and covers a land area of 0.84 km².

Haulashore Island is located offshore from Stepneyville.

Other public reserves in Stepneyville include Pioneers Park, Russell Reserve and Wakefield Quay Gardens.

History

The estimated population of Britannia reached 1,770 in 1996.

It was 1,830 in 2001, 1,566 in 2006, 1,650 in 2013, and 1,767 in 2018.

Demography

Britannia had a population of 1,767 at the 2018 New Zealand census, an increase of 117 people (7.1%) since the 2013 census, and an increase of 201 people (12.8%) since the 2006 census. There were 768 households. There were 846 males and 924 females, giving a sex ratio of 0.92 males per female. The median age was 45 years (compared with 37.4 years nationally), with 291 people (16.5%) aged under 15 years, 276 (15.6%) aged 15 to 29, 873 (49.4%) aged 30 to 64, and 330 (18.7%) aged 65 or older.

Ethnicities were 86.2% European/Pākehā, 10.2% Māori, 3.7% Pacific peoples, 5.8% Asian, and 2.5% other ethnicities (totals add to more than 100% since people could identify with multiple ethnicities).

The proportion of people born overseas was 27.5%, compared with 27.1% nationally.

Although some people objected to giving their religion, 58.2% had no religion, 28.0% were Christian, 1.2% were Hindu, 0.3% were Muslim, 1.0% were Buddhist and 3.9% had other religions.

Of those at least 15 years old, 468 (31.7%) people had a bachelor or higher degree, and 198 (13.4%) people had no formal qualifications. The median income was $33,000, compared with $31,800 nationally. The employment status of those at least 15 was that 690 (46.7%) people were employed full-time, 255 (17.3%) were part-time, and 48 (3.3%) were unemployed.

Economy

In 2018, 8.3% of the workforce worked in manufacturing, 6.7% worked in construction, 0.0% worked in retail and wholesale, 8.9% worked in hospitality, 5.7% worked in transport, 7.3% worked in education, and 10.8% worked in healthcare.

Transport

As of 2018, among those who commute to work, 78.6% drove a car, 2.8% rode in a car, 1.5% use a bike, and 1.5% walk or run.

No one used public transport.

References

Suburbs of Nelson, New Zealand
Populated places in the Nelson Region
Populated places around Tasman Bay / Te Tai-o-Aorere